Indrė Jakubaitytė (born 24 January 1976) is a female javelin thrower from Lithuania. Her personal best throw is 63.65 metres, achieved in September 2007 in Kaunas is also the current national record. She competed at the 2007 World Championships, but without reaching the final.

Achievements

References

External links
 
 
 

1976 births
Living people
Lithuanian female javelin throwers
Olympic athletes of Lithuania
Athletes (track and field) at the 2012 Summer Olympics
World Athletics Championships athletes for Lithuania